Beatriz Mendoza is a paralympic athlete from Spain competing mainly in category T12 sprint events.

Beatriz was first part of the Spanish Paralympic games team at their home games in 1992 where she won bronze in the 100m and 200m.  At the following games in Atlanta in 1996 she did the sprint double, winning gold in the 100m and 200m.  Her third and final games were in Sydney in 2000 Summer Paralympics where again competing in the 100m and 200m she won bronze in the 100m and silver in the 200m.

References

Paralympic athletes of Spain
Athletes (track and field) at the 1996 Summer Paralympics
Athletes (track and field) at the 2000 Summer Paralympics
Paralympic gold medalists for Spain
Paralympic silver medalists for Spain
Paralympic bronze medalists for Spain
Living people
Paralympic athletes with a vision impairment
Medalists at the 1996 Summer Paralympics
Medalists at the 2000 Summer Paralympics
Year of birth missing (living people)
Paralympic medalists in athletics (track and field)
Spanish female sprinters
Visually impaired sprinters
Paralympic sprinters
Spanish blind people